KFXA (channel 28) is a television station licensed to Cedar Rapids, Iowa, United States, serving Eastern Iowa as an affiliate of the digital multicast network Dabl. It is owned by Second Generation of Iowa, Ltd., which maintains a local marketing agreement (LMA) with Sinclair Broadcast Group, owner of dual CBS/Fox affiliate KGAN (channel 2, also licensed to Cedar Rapids), for the provision of certain services. Both stations share studios at Broadcast Park on Old Marion Road Northeast (along IA 100) in Cedar Rapids, while KFXA's transmitter is located in Van Horne, Iowa. The station's web presence is limited to the Federal Communications Commission (FCC)-required link to its public file and its programming schedule on the KGAN website.

History

The station signed on February 1, 1988, as KOCR with studios on Boyson Road Northeast in Cedar Rapids. Airing an analog signal on UHF channel 28, it was the first new full-market commercial station to launch in Eastern Iowa in 34 years. KOCR was a Fox affiliate from the beginning and owned by Gerald Fitzgerald and his company, Metro Program Network. After being on the air about two months, on March 25, 1988, the FCC ordered the station off the air because a $150 check from the station bounced. Once it got back on-air on April 22, 1988, the full story came out. Metro Program Network planned and had a construction permit for a  tower between Cedar Rapids and Waterloo. Lacking financing for such a tower, the company instead built a tiny  tower next to its studio building without approval of the FCC or Federal Aviation Administration (FAA). This resulted in the station being practically unviewable in the eastern part of the market, and its signal was spotty at best even in Cedar Rapids and Iowa City. It was thus forced to rely on cable television for most of its viewership. Cable systems in the Waterloo and Dubuque areas were never able to receive KOCR and went without access to Fox programming until June 1991 when the Foxnet cable network was established to serve cable systems in areas without access to Fox over the air.

By 1994, Fox was reaching new heights from gaining broadcast rights of the NFL's National Football Conference from CBS. However, KOCR's coverage area was not nearly as large as those of the other Eastern Iowa stations, so it sold local NFC rights to KGAN. Around this time, the station's long standing financial difficulties came to a head as the electricity was disconnected due to unpaid bills. The station then continued to broadcast thanks to a backup generator. On October 6, 1994, KOCR went off the air after being evicted from their offices due to unpaid rent. At the time of the eviction, more than $45,000 was owed to IES Utilities and nearly $100,000 was owed in back rent. After this, cable systems in Cedar Rapids and Iowa City carried Foxnet (which was already being carried in Dubuque) as an interim measure.

In 1995, the station was purchased by current owner Second Generation of Iowa for $1.25 million and returned to the air that August 13 under its current calls, KFXA. After the company took possession of the station, it entered into a local marketing agreement (LMA) with KDUB-TV in Dubuque which operated on UHF channel 40 as the ABC affiliate for the eastern part of the market. That station's call letters were changed to KFXB-TV, and it was converted into a semi-satellite of KFXA, serving as the Fox affiliate for the eastern portion of the market. The two stations were then branded together as "Fox 28 & 40". The LMA lasted until 2004 when Dubuque TV Limited Partnership sold KFXB to the Christian Television Network, making KFXA the sole Fox outlet for Northeastern Iowa.

Eventually after establishing an operational outsourcing agreement with the Sinclair Broadcast Group (owner of KGAN), Second Generation merged internal operations of KFXA into KGAN's studios. On February 1, 2008, Sinclair announced it would attempt to purchase KFXA outright for $19 million. The announcement was only partially true since the Sinclair press release only mentioned the company had acquired the non-license assets of KFXA, but holds the option to buy KFXA's license under a "failed station" waiver (which Sinclair has yet to exercise as of January 2012). Officially, Second Generation of Iowa continues to own KFXA's license but all of its operations are now outsourced to KGAN. KFXA has been digital-only since February 17, 2009.

As part of the KGAN twinstick, this station is considered an alternate CBS affiliate airing that network's programs when KGAN is unable to do so such as during a breaking news emergency (such as severe weather) or local special. The renewal of a retransmission dispute between Sinclair and Mediacom, Iowa's largest cable provider, threatened to result in KFXA being pulled from area cable systems. The dispute also affected KDSM-TV in Des Moines, which is directly owned by Sinclair. For a few weeks, it appeared that almost half the state would be left without access to the 2010 Orange Bowl which aired on Fox with the local favorite Iowa Hawkeyes football team defeating the Georgia Tech Yellow Jackets. On December 31, 2009, the expiration date of the original agreement, Sinclair agreed to give Mediacom an eight-day extension that would keep the Orange Bowl on-the-air. Two days after the game, the parties agreed to a one-year carriage deal. KFXA aired Big 12 Conference basketball and the Iowa high school state championships in football, wrestling, as well as boys and girls basketball for several years.

On May 15, 2012, Sinclair Broadcast Group and Fox agreed to a five-year extension to the network's affiliation agreement with Sinclair's 19 Fox stations, including KFXA, allowing them to continue carrying Fox programming until 2017. Sinclair moved Fox programming to KGAN's second subchannel on January 1, 2021, gaining the "Fox 28" branding. However, KFXA did not lose its Fox affiliation until February 2, when it switched to Dabl.

On July 28, 2021, the FCC issued a Forfeiture Order stemming from a lawsuit against KFXA owner Second Generation of Iowa. The lawsuit, filed by AT&T, alleged that Second Generation failed to negotiate for retransmission consent in good faith for KFXA. Owners of other Sinclair-managed stations, such as Deerfield Media, were also named in the lawsuit. Second Generation was ordered to pay a fine of $512,228.

News operation
Since KFXB operated as a semi-satellite of KFXA through the LMA, it allowed the former to keep its Dubuque-based news department established during its ABC affiliation. In 2004, Second Generation decided to close this operation down and have a combined news department based out of Cedar Rapids and KFXA. Currently, Dubuque has coverage provided though bureaus operated by KWWL and KCRG-TV. Ultimately, the former captured a majority of the local news market in the area. It is unknown exactly when KFXA's separate news department in Cedar Rapids was shut down with that outlet's consolidation with KGAN.

On March 4, 2001, KGAN began producing a nightly prime time newscast on sister station and fellow Fox affiliate KDSM-TV in Des Moines called Fox 17 News at 9:00PM. This half-hour show originated live from KGAN's studios and featured its own on-air personnel. There was regional news coverage and statewide weather forecasts provided since there were no locally based personnel in Des Moines. In 2002 for the convenience of Eastern Iowa viewers, the thirty-minute program was added to KFXA through a simulcast and renamed Fox 28 News at 9:00PM.

For the most part, the broadcast's format remained the same although Eastern Iowa reports from KGAN reporters were added. On September 2, 2008, NBC affiliate WHO-DT (then owned by Local TV, now owned by Tribune Broadcasting) in Des Moines entered into a news share agreement with KDSM. As a result, the big three outlet began producing a Central Iowa-focused prime time newscast on that station from WHO's studios. Today, KGAN continues to produce an hour-long prime time newscast at 9 seen every night on KFXA.

The station did not participate in the wider implementation of Sinclair's now-defunct, controversial News Central format for its newscasts but did air "The Point" (a one-minute conservative political commentary) that was also controversial and a requirement of all Sinclair-owned stations with local news until the series was discontinued in December 2006. In Fall 2005 despite having no weekday morning show of its own, KGAN began producing Good Day Iowa on KFXA. This was seen for two hours from 7 until 9 and competed against national morning shows on Eastern Iowa's big three affiliates. Due to inconsistent viewership and low ratings, the newscast was canceled in July 2007.

At some point in September 2011, KGAN brought back a weekday morning show to KFXA after adding an hour-long 7 a.m. newscast on weekdays, which is seen for an hour until 8 a.m.  Until July 30, 2017, the station remained the only news department in Eastern Iowa not to air local newscasts in true high definition, although the KGAN/KFXA operation upgraded its broadcasts to 16:9 standard-definition widescreen on April 8, 2012. KGAN operates a Doppler weather radar of its own at the Old Marion Road Northeast studios. Weather forecasts from this station can also heard on KCRR-FM 97.7, KOEL-FM 92.3, KKHQ-FM 98.5 and KCJJ-AM 1630.

On July 30, 2017, KGAN and KFXA became the last two stations in Eastern Iowa to begin airing local newscasts in true HD.

Subchannels
The station's digital signal is multiplexed:

References

Television channels and stations established in 1988
Sinclair Broadcast Group
FXA
Dabl affiliates
Charge! (TV network) affiliates
TBD (TV network) affiliates
Stadium (sports network) affiliates
Comet (TV network) affiliates
1988 establishments in Iowa
Missouri Valley Conference broadcasters